Here I Come Falling was a post-hardcore band from Springfield, Missouri, formed in 2005. They were signed to Rise Records in 2007. They released one album, Oh Grave, Where Is Thy Victory, on January 8, 2008. The album charted at number 46 on the Top Billboard Christian Albums. They broke up in August 2008. They stated lineup changes and "other troubles" as the reason for the breakup.

Discography
Studio albums
Oh Grave, Where Is Thy Victory (Rise Records, 2008)

Band members
Final line-up
Antony Rivera - lead vocals (The Overseer, ex-The Ghost Inside)
Daniel Alvarado - guitars (ex-Mychildren Mybride)
Parker Daniels - guitars [Recorded the album Oh Grave, Where Is Thy Victory]
Brian Papalardo - bass guitar
Isaac Neale - keyboards, synthesizers, programming
Austin Howell - drums

Former members
Colby Moore - lead vocals [Recorded the album Oh Grave, Where Is Thy Victory]
Jeff Choate - clean vocals, keyboards, synthesizers, programming [Recorded the album Oh Grave, Where Is Thy Victory]
Rick Griffith - bass guitar (ex-Agraceful) [Recorded the album Oh Grave, Where Is Thy Victory]
Kasey Smith - guitar (ex-Agraceful) [Recorded the album Oh Grave, Where Is Thy Victory]
Chip Mezo - keyboards, synthesizers, programming
Princeton Patterson - drums [Recorded the album Oh Grave, Where Is Thy Victory]
Joe Hull - drums
Andy Foell - bass guitar
Dezmond Scotton - drums
Nik Myers - bass guitar

References

External links

Hardcore punk groups from Missouri
Musical groups established in 2005
Musical groups disestablished in 2008
Christian hardcore musical groups